Karnaprayag is a town and municipal board in the Chamoli District in the Indian state of Uttarakhand. Karnaprayag is one of the Panch Prayag (five confluences) of Alaknanda River, situated at the confluence of the Alaknanda and Pindar River.

Demographics
As of the 2001 census, Karnaprayag had a population of 6976. Males constitute 56% of the population, and females make up 44%. Karnaprayag has an average literacy rate of 76%, higher than the national average of 59.5%. Male literacy is 81%, and female literacy is 69%. 13% of the population is under six years of age.

Geography
It has an average elevation of 860 metres (2,820 feet).
The confluence of the Pindar River, which arises from the icy Pindari glacier and the Alaknanda, occurs at Karnaprayag. 
Nanda Devi, towering above at 7,816 m (25,634 ft.), and surrounded by an array of glittering peaks, Trisul, Drona Giri, Nanda Ghunti, Mrigathuni, and Maiktoli.

Overview
Karnaprayag is one of five sites where the confluence of rivers occurs. The five prayags are Vishnuprayag, Nandprayag, Karnaprayag, Rudraprayag, and Devprayag. Allahabad(Prayagraj), where the Ganges, Yamuna, and mythical Saraswati join, is known as Prayag and is one of the holy places of Hindu pilgrimage. Karnaprayag is believed by many to be the place where Karna of the Mahabharata, was to have worshipped the Sun God. There is an ancient temple devoted to Uma in Karnaprayag.

In some versions, Karnaprayag is the place where Lord Krishna did the cremation of Karna. 
When Arjuna used the Anjalika astra on weaponless Karna, who was still trying to lift the sunken chariot wheel, Lord Krishna found that Karna was still alive even though seriously wounded. Lord Krishna found that Dharma-devata, the goddess responsible for protecting Dharma (righteousness), is guarding Karna against death and resisting every arrow sent by Arjuna. Krishna and Arjuna found it was impossible to kill Karna as the goddess was protecting Karna personally. Lord Krishna explained to Arjuna that the Dharma-devata herself was protecting Karna from death because of the massive good merit Karna earned by giving charity during his lifetime and it was impossible even for Lord Shiva to kill Karna. Krishna said wherever Dharma is present, there is victory, and this time Dharma  was with the side of Karna. So Krishna went down from his chariot and appeared as a Brahmin and asked for Karna's punya or merit to him as charity. Karna gave his entire merits as charity to the Brahmin in the form of his blood, and once Karna gifted his life's merit to him, Krishna rewarded Karna with the view of Krishna's Vishwaroopa. Krishna told that only this way it was possible to kill Karna and when Karna gave away his life's merit to Krishna, Dharma-devata disappeared. Karna asked Krishna to cremate him in a virgin land where nobody else is present. Then Krishna went back to his chariot and asked Arjuna to take the kill shot on Karna. Later Krishna himself did the cremation of Karna at Karnaprayag.

It is on the way to Badrinath, on the confluence of two holy rivers Alaknanda and Pindar. It is said that Karna of Mahabharata meditated here for many years to acquire the impregnable shield, which made him a formidable warrior in the battlefield. Swami Vivekananda meditated here for eighteen days with his Guru Bhai, Guru Turianand ji and Akharanand ji. It is the sub-divisional headquarters of district Chamoli. Roads from here go to Almora, Nainital, and Jim Corbett National Park.

How to reach

Air

Railway
The nearest railway station is at Rishikesh. However, Rishikesh is a small railway station not connected by fast trains. Haridwar railway junction, 24 km farther from Rishikesh, has train connections to most of the major cities in India and is, therefore, the railhead for Karnaprayag.

A new railway line, connecting Rishikesh with Karnaprayag is under construction.

Road
Karnaprayag lies on national highway NH58 that connects Delhi with Badrinath and Mana Pass in Uttarakhand near Indo-Tibet border. Therefore all the buses and vehicles that carry pilgrims from New Delhi to Badrinath via Haridwar and Rishikesh in pilgrim season of summer months pass through Karnaprayag on the way to Joshimath and further north. Rishikesh is the major starting point for the road journey to Karnaprayag, and regular buses operate from Rishikesh bus station to Karnaprayag. The road distance from  Rishikesh to Karnaprayag is  via Rudraprayag and Srinagar (Uttarakhand).

 Haridwar to Rishikesh     24 km
 Rishikesh to Devprayag    74 km 
 Devprayag to Srinagar     34 km
 Srinagar to Rudraprayag   33 km
 Rudraprayag to  Karnaprayag 31 km

Gallery

See also
 Badhangarhi temple

References

External links
 Karnaprayag, Official website
 Karnaprayag on wikimapia

Cities and towns in Chamoli district